The Mountain Waters Scenic Byway is a  National Forest Scenic Byway that traverses through the Nantahala National Forest, in Western North Carolina.  It features two river gorges, hardwood forests and countryside vistas.

Route description
The first part of this  byway follows the combined route of U.S. 64 and NC 28 from Highlands, North Carolina to Franklin, North Carolina and features views of the Cullasaja Gorge, the Cullasaja River and numerous waterfalls, including:
Bridal Veil Falls, actually from a tributary creek
Dry Falls, which visitors can walk behind without getting wet
Quarry Falls, also known as Bust-Yer-Butt Falls
Cullasaja Falls, the major cascade of falls

From Franklin, the Mountain Waters Scenic Byway follows SR 1442 to the west, climbing through Wayah Gap (elevation: 4,180 ft) on the way to Nantahala Lake and then to the community of Aquone.  From Aquone, SR 1442 follows the Nantahala River to Beechertown, where it joins U.S. 19/74, which the byway follows to its ending point in the community of Lauada.  The route from Aquone to Lauada features the Nantahala Gorge.

History

Junction list

See also

 Blue Ridge Parkway
 Cherohala Skyway
 Foothills Parkway
 Forest Heritage Scenic Byway
 North Carolina Bicycle Route 2

References

External links
 
 National Forests in North Carolina

Transportation in North Carolina
National Forest Scenic Byways
Transportation in Macon County, North Carolina
Protected areas of Macon County, North Carolina
Transportation in Swain County, North Carolina
Protected areas of Swain County, North Carolina
U.S. Route 19
U.S. Route 64
U.S. Route 74